Entrelacs is a municipality in Matawinie Regional County Municipality in the Lanaudière region of Quebec, Canada.

Prior to February 13, 1991, it was in Les Pays-d'en-Haut Regional County Municipality in the Laurentides region.

History
The area is part of the geographic township of Wexford, named after a town and county in Ireland, and first settled by Irish colonists circa 1840. In 1860, the Township Municipality of Wexford was established.

In 1967, it was decided to change the name to Entrelacs, meaning "between lakes" in reference to its position between Lakes Patrick and Des Îles. This name had already been used to identify the post office since 1889, but which closed in 1974.

Demographics

Population

Private dwellings occupied by usual residents: 587 (total dwellings: 1131)

Language
Mother tongue (2021)

Education

Commission scolaire des Samares operates French-language public schools:
 École Notre-Dame-de-la-Merci — Saint-Émile (pavillon Saint-Émile)

Sir Wilfrid Laurier School Board operates English-language public schools:
 Rawdon Elementary School in Rawdon (serves all of the city)
 Saint Adèle Elementary School in Saint-Adèle (serves a portion)
 Joliette High School in Joliette (serves all of the city)

See also
List of municipalities in Quebec

References

Incorporated places in Lanaudière
Municipalities in Quebec
Matawinie Regional County Municipality